The 2024 United States House of Representatives elections in Washington will be held on November 5, 2024, to elect the ten U.S. representatives from the State of Washington, one from each of the state's congressional districts. The elections will coincide with the 2024 U.S. presidential election, as well as other elections to the House of Representatives, elections to the United States Senate, and various state and local elections.

District 3

The incumbent is Democrat Marie Gluesenkamp Perez, who flipped the district and was elected with 50.1% of the vote in 2022.

Candidates

Declared
Joe Kent (Republican), technology project manager, U.S. Army veteran, and runner-up in 2022

Potential
Marie Gluesenkamp Perez (Democratic), incumbent U.S. Representative
Jaime Herrera Beutler (Republican), former U.S. Representative
Jim Walsh (Republican) Washington State Representative

General election

Predictions

District 8

The incumbent is Democrat Kim Schrier, who was re-elected with 53.3% of the vote in 2022.

Candidates

Declared
Carmen Goers (Republican), banker

Potential
Kim Schrier (Democratic), incumbent U.S. Representative

General election

Predictions

References

2024
Washington